Xining is the capital city of Qinghai province, China.

Xining may also refer to:
Xining (1068–1077), a reign period by Emperor Shenzong of Song

Other places in China
Xining, Leibo County, Sichuan
Xining Subdistrict, Liaoyuan, Jilin
Xining Subdistrict, Suining, Sichuan
Xining Subdistrict, Xuanwei, Yunnan

See also
 Dongning (disambiguation)